Friedrich Uebelhoer (born 25 September 1893 in Rothenburg ob der Tauber, Bavaria – presumed died 1945) was a German politician and official with the Nazi Party.

Early life
Uebelhoer served as an officer in the German Imperial Army in the First World War. He joined the Nazi Party initially in 1922 then again in 1925, following the revocation of the ban placed on the group after the Munich putsch.

He became Kreisleiter in Naumburg (Saale) in 1931. He was Mayor of Naumburg from 1933 to 1939 and also served as head of the National Socialist People's Welfare in Gau Halle-Merseburg.

SS activity
Uebelhoer held the rank of Brigadeführer in the Schutzstaffel and received commendation for his involvement in the annexation of the Sudetenland and for his part in the Anschluss. Following the occupation of Poland, he served as an inspector in the Reichsgau Wartheland. In Łódź he ordered the construction of the Jewish ghetto on 10 December 1939, a measure he described as only temporary, adding that ultimately the Nazis intended to "burn out this plague dump".

In early October 1941, Uebelhoer drew the ire of Reinhard Heydrich when he vehemently protested against the intended deportation of 60,000 German Jews to the already overcrowded ghetto.  In a letter to Uebelhoer, Heydrich threatened to draw "appropriate conclusions" if Uebelhoer did not change his stance.  Through negotiations with Adolf Eichmann, the number eventually reached was 20,000 Jews and 5,000 Gypsies sent to Łódź, with tens of thousands sent to other ghettos.  In November that year, to assuage Uebelhoer's qualms about ghetto arson started by Gypsies, Heinrich Himmler advised Uebelhoer to shoot ten Gypsies for every fire that broke out within the ghetto.  Those Gypsies who did not perish in the Łódź Ghetto were killed by gas vans in January 1942 in Chełmno.

Uebelhoer was dismissed from his post as governor of Łódź in December 1942 after being accused of embezzlement by Arthur Greiser. The charges were ultimately unproven, but the suspicion damaged his reputation and halted his advancement in the SS. He would return in January 1944 in the lesser role of governor of the Merseburg district.

Uebelhoer disappeared in the latter days of the Second World War and remained unaccounted for. He was declared legally dead in 1950.

References

Bibliography

 

1893 births
1945 deaths
Mayors of places in Saxony-Anhalt
Officials of Nazi Germany
German Army personnel of World War I
SS-Brigadeführer
People from Ansbach (district)
People from the Kingdom of Bavaria
People declared dead in absentia
Łódź Ghetto
Kreisleiter
20th-century Freikorps personnel
Romani genocide perpetrators
Holocaust perpetrators in Poland